Eduard "Edu" Campabadal Clarós (born 26 January 1993) is a Spanish professional footballer. Mainly a right back, he can also play as a central defender.

Club career

Wigan Athletic
Born in Tarragona, Catalonia, Campabadal joined Wigan Athletic in July 2012 after being released by FC Barcelona. He made his debut for the first team on 19 May 2013 on the final day of the Premier League season in a 2–2 draw against Aston Villa.

Córdoba
On 21 July 2013, Campabadal signed a two-year deal with Córdoba CF in Segunda División, being initially assigned to the reserves in Segunda División B. He made his first-team debut on 8 December, starting in a 1–2 away loss against Real Zaragoza.

Campabadal appeared in 17 matches during the 2013–14 season, as the Andalusians returned to La Liga after a 42-year absence. On 12 September 2014 he made his debut in the competition, starting in a 1–1 away draw against UD Almería but being replaced in the 68th minute due to an injury.

Mallorca / Lugo
On 3 July 2015 Campabadal joined RCD Mallorca, after rescinding his contract with Córdoba. On 6 July 2017, after suffering relegation, he signed a two-year deal with CD Lugo.

International career
Campabadal has played for the Spain U17 and Spain U18 national teams, and played in the final of the 2010 UEFA European Under-17 Football Championship.

References

External links

1993 births
Living people
Sportspeople from Tarragona
Spanish footballers
Footballers from Catalonia
Association football defenders
La Liga players
Segunda División players
Córdoba CF B players
Córdoba CF players
RCD Mallorca players
CD Lugo players
Premier League players
Wigan Athletic F.C. players
Spanish expatriate footballers
Expatriate footballers in England
Spanish expatriate sportspeople in England
Spain youth international footballers